Cyrille is both a French masculine given name and a surname. Notable people with the name include:

People with the given name
 Cyrille Adoula (1921–1978), Congolese politician who served as Premier of the Republic of the Congo (1961–1964)
 Cyrille Aimée (born 1984), French jazz singer
 Cyrille Beaudry (1835–1904), Canadian priest and educator
 Cyrille Florent Bella (born 1975), Cameroonian football player (senior career from 1998) who was a member of the Cameroonian national team (1997 and 2003)
 Cyrille Carré (born 1984), French Olympic canoeist and 2007 ICF Canoe Sprint World Champion in the K-2 1000 m event
 Cyrille-Hector-Octave Côté (1809–1850), physician who served in the Legislative Assembly of Lower Canada and went on to be ordained as a Baptist minister
 Cyrille Courtin (born 1971), French football player (senior career 1989–2003)
 Cyrille-Fraser Delâge (1869–1957), Canadian notary and political figure who served in the Legislative Assembly of Quebec (1901–1916) including as Speaker (1912–1916)
 Cyrille Diabaté (born 1973), French mixed martial arts fighter and kickboxer
 Cyrille Dion (1843–1878) ("the Bismarck of Billiards"), Canadian champion player of pool and billiards
 Cyril Domoraud (Depri Cyrille Leandre Domoraud) (born 1971), Ivorian football player (senior career 1992–2008) who played for the Côte d'Ivoire national team (1995–2006)
 Cyrille Doyon (1842–1918), merchant, farmer and politician who served in the Canadian House of Commons (1887–1891) and in the Legislative Assembly of Quebec (1892–1897)
 Cyrille Dumaine (1897–1946), Canadian politician from Quebec
 Cyrille Estève (aka "Cyrille the Spoonman"), busker in the city of Montreal in Canada
 Octave-Cyrille Fortier (1810–1872 or later), Canadian physician and politician who served in the Legislative Assembly of the Province of Canada (1854–1861)
 François-Cyrille Grange (born 1983), French alpine skier and Winter Olympian
 Cyrille Guimard (born 1947), French professional road bicycle racer (1968–1976) and later sporting director / team manager (from 1976)
 Cyrille Mubiala Kitambala (born 1974), Congolese football player (senior career from 1998) who joined the Congolese national team in 2002
 Johan Cyrille Corneel Vande Lanotte (born 1955), Belgian politician and Member of the Senate (from 2007) 
 Cyrille Pierre Théodore Laplace (1793–1875), French navigator who circumnavigated the globe on board La Favorite
 Cyrille Magnier (born 1969), French football player (senior career 1987–2005)
 Cyrille Makanaky (born 1965), Cameroonian football player (senior career 1984–1997) who played in the Cameroonian national team (1987–1992) 
 Cyrille Makanda (born 1980), Cameroonian-Russian basketball player who competes internationally for Cameroon
 Arthur Cyrille Albert Malouin (1857–1936), Canadian lawyer and politician who served in the Canadian House of Commons (1898–1905), as a Judge of the Quebec Superior Court (1905–1924), and as a Justice of the Supreme Court (1924) 
 Cyrille Mangan (born 1976), Cameroonian football player (senior career 1996–2008) who was a member of the Cameroonian national team (1996–1998)
 Cyrille Merville (born 1982), French football player (senior career from 1999)
 Albert-Marie Joseph Cyrille de Monléon (born 1937), former Bishop of Pamiers (1988–1999) and current Bishop of Meaux (from 1999)
 Cyrille Monnerais (born 1983), French professional road bicycle racer
 Joseph Cyrille Ndo (born 1976), Cameroonian football player (senior career from 1997) who was a member of the Cameroonian national team (1998–2002)
 Cyrille Neveu (born 1973), Long Distance Triathlon World Champion (2002) who established the Alpe d'Huez Triathlon in 2006
 Cyrille Pouget (born 1972), French football player (senior career, 1994–2006) who played on the French national team in 1996
 Cyrille Regis (1958–2018), French-born footballer (senior career 1977–1996) who played for the England national team (1982–1987)
 Cyrille Rose (1830–1902/3?), French clarinet teacher and composer of clarinet pedagogical material still in wide use
 Cyrille Sauvage (born 1973), French racecar driver who has competed in International Formula 3000 and Porsche Supercup series and won Formula Renault Championships in 1995
 Cyrille Sevin, French three-times World Champion at the strategic board game Diplomacy, recorded in the International prize list of Diplomacy
 Cyrille Thouvenin, actor, who played the character of Laurent in the French television drama Just a Question of Love (film)
 Cyrille Émile Vaillancourt (1848–1912), physician and political figure who served in the Canadian House of Commons (1891–1896)
 Cyrille Vaillancourt (1892–1969), journalist, civil servant, businessman and political figure who served in the Legislative Council of Quebec (1943–1944) and the Canadian Senate(1944–1969)
 Cyrille van Effenterre, current President of the IDEA League, a strategic alliance of five of Europe's leading universities of technology
 Cyrille van Hauwaert (1883–1974), Belgian professional road bicycle racer who won classics including Bordeaux–Paris (1907 and 1909), Milan–San Remo (1908), and Paris–Roubaix (1908)
 Cyrille van Hoof, housemate in the first season of Big Brother 1999 (Netherlands)
 Cyrille Verbrugge (1866–1929), Belgian Olympic fencer
 Cyrille Verdeaux, leader of the progressive rock band Clearlight (French band)
 Cyrille Watier (born 1972), French football player (senior career 1994–2007)
 Jean-Cyrille Guesnon de Bonneuil, married name of Michelle de Bonneuil (1748–1829), French overseas agent during the French Revolution and First French Empire

People with the surname
 Andrew Cyrille (born 1939), American avant-garde jazz drummer

Fictional characters
 Cyrille, fictional character in the PlayStation 2 action role-playing game Shining Force EXA

See also
 Saint-Cyrille-de-Lessard, Quebec, a parish municipality in Quebec, Canada
 Saint-Cyrille-de-Wendover, Quebec, a town located alongside the Rivière des Saults in the Drummond Regional County Municipality of Quebec, Canada
 Cyril Leo Heraclius, Prince Toumanoff (born Toumanishvili) (1913–1997), Russian-born historian and genealogist who was a Professor Emeritus at Georgetown University

French masculine given names